, established in 1999, is the holding company at the head of a Japanese corporate group that supplies statistics and information on music and the music industry in Japan and Western music. It started as, which was founded by Sōkō Koike in November 1967 and became known for its music charts. Oricon Inc. was originally set up as a subsidiary of Original Confidence and took over the latter's Oricon record charts in April 2002.

The charts are compiled from data drawn from some 39,700 retail outlets (as of April 2011) and provide sales rankings of music CDs, DVDs, electronic games, and other entertainment products based on weekly tabulations. Results are announced every Tuesday and published in Oricon Style by subsidiary Oricon Entertainment Inc. The group also lists panel survey-based popularity ratings for television commercials on its official website.

Oricon started publishing Combined Chart, which includes CD sales, digital sales, and streaming together, on December 19, 2018.

History

Original Confidence Inc., the original Oricon company, was founded by the former Snow Brand Milk Products promoter Sōkō Koike in 1967. That November, the company began publishing a singles chart on an experimental basis. 
Entitled , this went official on January 4, 1968.

Like the preceding Japanese music charts provided by Tokushin Music Report which was started in 1962, early Original Confidence was an exclusive information magazine only for the people who worked in the music industry. In the 1970s, Koike advertised his company's charts to make its existence prevail among the Japanese public. Thanks to his intensive promotional efforts through multiple media including television programs, the hit parade became known by its abbreviation "Oricon" by the late 1970s.

The company shortened its name to Oricon in 1992 and was split into a holding company and several subsidiaries in 1999. Since Sōkō Koike's death, Oricon has been managed by the founder's relatives.

Policy
Oricon monitors and reports on sales of CDs, DVDs, video games, and entertainment content in several other formats; manga and book sales were also formerly covered. Charts are published every Tuesday in Oricon Style and on Oricon's official website. Every Monday, Oricon receives data from outlets, but data on merchandise sold through certain channels does not make it into the charts. For example, the debut single of NEWS, a pop group, was released only through 7-Eleven stores, which are not covered by Oricon, and its sales were not reflected in the Oricon charts. Oricon's rankings of record sales are therefore not completely accurate. Before data was collected electronically, the charts were compiled on the basis of faxes that were sent from record shops.

Controversy 
In 2006, Oricon sued journalist Hiro Ugaya when he was quoted in a Saizo (or Cyso) magazine article as suggesting that Oricon was manipulating its statistics to benefit certain management companies and labels, specifically Johnny and Associates. Ugaya condemned the lawsuit as an example of a strategic lawsuit against public participation (SLAPP) in Japan. The lawsuit, filed by Oricon on November 17, 2006, accused Ugaya of "mendacious comments" and demanded 50 million yen (318,000 euros) in damages. In the interview, Ugaya questioned the validity of Oricon's hit chart on the grounds that its statistical methods were not transparent. Many NGOs, including Reporters Without Borders, denounced the lawsuit as a violation of free expression. A Tokyo District Court initially ordered Ugaya to pay 1 million yen in damages, but Ugaya appealed to the Tokyo high court. Oricon later dropped the charges, after a 33-month battle. No criminal charge was laid against the journalist.

Dropping a lawsuit is rare in Japan; for example, only 0.1% of cases that ended in 2007 being done by the plaintiff ceasing the case.

Shareholders
(as of March 31, 2012)
 LitruPond LLC – 29.34%
 Yoshiaki Yoshida (DHC Corp. president) – 8.94%
 Hikari Tsushin, Inc. – 4.94%
 Ko Koike (CEO) – 2.75%
 Lawson, Inc. – 1.98%
 Hidekō Koike – 1.89%
 Naoko Koike – 1.87%
 DHC Corp. – 1.59%
 Yumi Koike – 1.55%

Charts

Current charts 
 Singles Chart (January 4, 1968 – present)
 Albums Chart (October 5, 1987 – present)
 Karaoke Chart (December 26, 1994 – present)
 DVD Chart (April 5, 1999 – present)
 Book Chart (April 7, 2008 – present)
 Comic Chart (February 6, 1995 – March 26, 2001; April 7, 2008 – present)
 Bunkobon Chart (April 7, 2008 – present)
 Blu-ray Disc Chart (September 7, 2008 – present)
 Music DVD & Blu-ray Disc Chart (October 14, 2013 – present)
 Long Hit Album Catalogue Chart (April 2, 2001 – present)
 Digital Albums Chart (November 14, 2016 – present)
 Digital Singles Chart (December 25, 2017 – present)
 Streaming Chart (December 24, 2018 – present)
 Combined Albums Chart (December 24, 2018 – present)
 Combined Singles Chart (December 24, 2018 – present)

Past charts 
 LP Chart (January 5, 1970 – November 27, 1989)
 CT Chart (December 2, 1974 – April 24, 1978)
 Cartridges Chart (December 2, 1974 – April 24, 1978)
 CD Chart (February 6, 1984 – April 21, 1997)
 LD Chart (February 6, 1984 – January 31, 2000)
 Sell-Video Chart (February 6, 1984 – May 30, 2005)
 VHD Chart (February 6, 1984 – November 27, 1989)
 MD Chart (1994)
 Game Software Chart (February 20, 1995 – November 28, 2005)
 All-Genre Formats Ranking (May 24, 1984 – April 2, 2001)
 New Media Chart (January 2004 – 2005)
 Tracks Chart (September 6, 2004 – August 31, 2008)

Artists' total sales revenue by year

See also
 List of Oricon number-one singles
 List of Oricon number-one albums
 List of best-selling singles in Japan
 List of best-selling albums in Japan

References

External links 
  

 
Music companies of Japan
Japanese record charts
Japanese companies established in 1967
Japanese companies established in 1999